Buried by the Bernards is an American reality comedy series created by Netflix. The series centers on the Bernard family, who operate R. Bernard Funeral Services in Memphis, Tennessee. The series consists of eight episodes that were released on February 12, 2021.

Synopsis
The series follows the day-to-day operations of a funeral home in Memphis, run by the Bernard family matriarch, Debbie; her son, Ryan; Ryan's uncle, Kevin; and Ryan's daughters, Raegan and Deja.

Production
R. Bernard Funeral Services opened in 2017 in Memphis, Tennessee. The Bernard family  received national publicity for the funeral home due to viral marketing campaigns. After the business received publicity, Ryan Bernard was contacted by producer Warren D. Robinson about developing a comedic reality series.

The series was filmed in early 2020 just prior to social distancing restrictions brought on by the COVID-19 pandemic. While the show is not scripted, certain episodes shot in a single day were sometimes depicted as if they happened over several days.

Buried by the Bernards debuted on Netflix on February 12, 2021.

Episodes

Season 1 (2021)

Reception 
The series received mainly positive reception. In a positive review, Kathryn VanArendonk wrote for Vulture, "The appeal is really in the family dynamic. The Bernards are palpably exasperated with one another, and they also come across as people who sincerely care about each other." Noting the greater context of a show about funeral homes airing amid a deadly pandemic, Allison Herman of The Ringer asserted, "Even a show that actively tries to be escapist can't transcend subject matter this heavy—far heavier than the Bernards could have anticipated when they were mugging for the cameras. In the end, Buried with the Bernards is unfortunately trapped between the light and the macabre."

References

External links 
 Official website

2021 American television series debuts
2020s American black television series
2020s American reality television series
Television series about families
Television shows filmed in Tennessee
Television shows set in Tennessee
African-American television
English-language Netflix original programming